Marry Me is a 1932 British musical comedy film directed by Wilhelm Thiele and starring Renate Müller, Harry Green and George Robey. It was made by Gainsborough Pictures at Islington Studios. The film's sets were designed by the art director Alex Vetchinsky.

A separate German-language version Girls to Marry was made, also directed by Thiele and starring Müller but with an otherwise different cast.

Cast 
 Renate Müller as Ann Linden  
 Harry Green as Sigurd Bernstein  
 George Robey as Aloysius Novak  
 Ian Hunter as Robert Hart  
 Maurice Evans as Paul hart 
 Billy Caryll as Meyer  
 Charles Hawtrey as Billy Hart  
 Charles Carson as Korten  
 Viola Lyel as Frau Krause 
 Sunday Wilshin as Ida Brun 
 Roland Culver as Tailor 
 Brian Lawrance as Singer

References

Bibliography
 Low, Rachael. Filmmaking in 1930s Britain. George Allen & Unwin, 1985.
 Wood, Linda. British Films, 1927-1939. British Film Institute, 1986.

External links

1932 films
British musical comedy films
1932 musical comedy films
1930s English-language films
Films directed by Wilhelm Thiele
Islington Studios films
British multilingual films
British remakes of German films
British black-and-white films
Gainsborough Pictures films
Films with screenplays by Franz Schulz
1932 multilingual films
1930s British films